Florencia Zaccanti (born in Mar del Plata, Argentina) is an Argentine model, television personality and reality star.

Biography 
Florencia is the daughter of former Racing Club de Avellaneda soccer player Cosme Zaccanti.

The name of Florencia began to be heard in the media when it was related as the third in discord between actress Jimena Baron and soccer player Daniel Osvaldo.

This situation led him to enter "Gran Hermano 2015", thanks to the public vote in a playoff. 
Her participation in the house was 35 days when after a nomination she obtained 53.8% of the public's votes to be expelled. 

In 2016, she participated in a vote to enter "Gran Hermano 2016" but it was not selected by the public. 

In 2017 she served as secretary of the program Nosotros a la mañana.

After years away from the medium, she announced that she would be one of the participants of "Too Hot to Handle (TV series)" in its Latin version for Netflix. The season premiered on September 15, 2021.

Abstract

References

Living people
Year of birth missing (living people)

Argentine models
Participants in Argentine reality television series